Women on Trial is a 1992 documentary film directed by Academy Award winner Lee Grant. The film follows a group of women navigating the family court system in Texas. Originally scheduled to aired on HBO, the film played only a single night before being pulled from the public after inciting a million dollar lawsuit initiated Texas family court judge Charles Dean Huckabee. The story unfolds as woman after woman loses custody of her children to fathers who have either a documented history of abuse, or admittedly do not want custody of the children.

Development
Women on Trial was produced under Grant and husband/producer Joseph Feury's production deal with HBO. Grant became interest after seeing the number of women losing custody of their children to allegedly abusive fathers in Harris County, Texas.

Reception
The film received positive reviews. Before the film was pulled, disappearing for the next 27 years, Variety felt that it was "chilling...starkly moving."

Legacy
The film is part of Grant's documentary collection and is expected to receive a digital and limited repertory cinema re-release in the Winter of 2019-2020 along with the majority of her non-fiction work. A screening at New York's Film Forum in December 2019 will mark the film's first public exhibition since its single night on HBO.

References

External links
 

1992 documentary films
1992 films
American documentary films
Films directed by Lee Grant
History of women in Texas
1990s English-language films
1990s American films